A Dictionary and Glossary of the Koran, was first published in 1873 by John Penrice. It is a small compact reference guide consisting of 180 pages. It contains detailed entries on parts of speech and the meanings of words of the Quran.

Overview
The dictionary is supposed to be an authoritative work of its kind. It has, at places, explained the Islamic tenets and article of worship also, to make the text comprehensive. 

Nothing further could be known about the author John Penrice except that he was the author of A Dictionary and Glossary of the Koran. The book has been repeatedly published since its first publication in 1873. This edition is published by the Library of Islam, Kazi Publications   (1988).

References

External links
Read, Learn & Understand The Quran

Arabic dictionaries
Works about the Quran